Electrotherapy is the use of electrical energy as a medical treatment. In medicine, the term electrotherapy can apply to a variety of treatments, including the use of electrical devices such as deep brain stimulators for neurological disease. The term has also been applied specifically to the use of electric current to speed wound healing. Additionally, the term "electrotherapy" or "electromagnetic therapy" has also been applied to a range of alternative medical devices and treatments.

Medical uses

Electrotherapy is primarily used in physical therapy for:
 relaxation of muscle spasms
 prevention and retardation of disuse atrophy
 increase of local blood circulation
 muscle rehabilitation and re-education
 electrical muscle stimulation
 maintaining and increasing range of motion
 management of chronic and intractable pain including diabetic neuropathy
 acute post-traumatic and post-surgical pain
 post-surgical stimulation of muscles to prevent venous thrombosis
 wound healing
 drug delivery

Some of the treatment effectiveness mechanisms are little understood, with effectiveness and best practices for their use still anecdotal.

Musculoskeletal conditions

In general, there is little evidence that electrotherapy is effective in the management of musculoskeletal conditions.
In particular, there is no evidence that electrotherapy is effective in the relief of pain arising from osteoarthritis,
and little to no evidence available to support electrotherapy for the management of fibromyalgia.

Neck and back pain

A 2016 review found that, "in evidence of no effectiveness," clinicians should not offer electrotherapy for the treatment of neck pain or associated disorders.
Earlier reviews found that no conclusions could be drawn about the effectiveness of electrotherapy for neck pain,
and that electrotherapy has limited effect on neck pain as measured by clinical results.

A 2015 review found that the evidence for electrotherapy in pregnancy-related lower back pain is "very limited".

Shoulder disorders

A 2014 Cochrane review found insufficient evidence to determine whether electrotherapy was better than exercise at treating adhesive capsulitis.
As of 2004, there is insufficient evidence to draw conclusions about any intervention for rotator cuff pathology, including electrotherapy;
furthermore, methodological problems precluded drawing conclusions about the efficacy of any rehabilitation method for impingement syndrome.

Other musculoskeletal disorders

There is limited, low quality evidence for a slight benefit of noxious-level electrotherapy in the treatment of epicondylitis.

A 2012 review found that "Small, single studies showed that some electrotherapy modalities may be beneficial" in rehabilitating ankle bone fractures.
 However, a 2008 review found it to be ineffective in healing long-bone fractures.

A 2012 review found that evidence that electrotherapy contributes to recovery from knee conditions is of "limited quality".

Chronic pain

A 2004 Cochrane review found "weaker evidence" that pulsating electromagnetic fields could be effective in treating recurrent headaches. A 2016 Cochrane review found that supporting evidence for electrotherapy as a treatment for complex regional pain syndrome is "absent or unclear."

Chronic wounds

A 2015 review found that the evidence supporting the use of electrotherapy in healing pressure ulcers was of low quality, and a 2015 Cochrane review found that no evidence that electromagnetic therapy, a subset of electrotherapy, was effective in healing pressure ulcers. Earlier reviews found that, because of low-quality evidence, it was unclear whether electrotherapy increases healing rates of pressure ulcers. By 2014 the evidence supported electrotherapy's efficacy for ulcer healing.

Another 2015 Cochrane review found no evidence supporting the user of electrotherapy for venous stasis ulcers.

Mental health and mood disorders 
Since the 1950s, over 150 published articles have found a positive outcome in using cranial electrostimulation (CES) to treat depression, anxiety, and insomnia.

Contraindications 
Electrotherapy is contraindicated for people with:
 medical implants or stimulators like a cardiac pacemaker
 certain cardiovascular diseases
 women who are pregnant
 deep vein thrombosis
 cognitive impairment

History

The first recorded treatment of a patient by electricity was by Johann Gottlob Krüger in 1743.  John Wesley promoted electrical treatment as a universal panacea in 1747 but was rejected by mainstream medicine.  Giovanni Aldini treated insanity with static electricity 1823–1824.

The first recorded medical treatments with electricity in London were in 1767 at Middlesex Hospital in London using a special apparatus. The same apparatus was purchased for St. Bartholomew's Hospital ten years later. Guy's Hospital has a published list of cases from the early 19th century. Golding Bird at Guy's brought electrotherapy into the mainstream in the mid-19th century.  In the second half of the 19th century the emphasis moved from delivering large shocks to the whole body to more measured doses, the minimum effective.

Apparatus
Electrotherapy equipment has historically included:
 The electric bath for high-voltage static induction
 Oudin coil, a high-voltage induction coil, in use around 1900
 Pulvermacher's chain, a wearable electrochemical device mostly used by quacks, in use second half of 19th century
 Leyden jars, an early form of capacitor, for storing electricity
 Electrostatic generators of various sorts

People 
Some important people in the history of electrotherapy include;
 Luigi Galvani, a pioneer of medical electricity
 Benjamin Franklin, an early proponent of electrotherapy who made it widely known, but mostly taken up by quacks and charlatans
 Golding Bird, mentioned above
 Charles Grafton Page
 Duchenne de Boulogne
 Jacques-Arsène d'Arsonval
 George Miller Beard
 Margaret Cleaves, a promoter of ozone therapy
 Many of the forms of electricity used in electrotherapy were named after scientists

Notable historic fringe practitioners 
 James Graham
 Franz Mesmer

Muscle stimulation
In 1856 Guillaume Duchenne announced that alternating was superior to direct current for electrotherapeutic triggering of muscle contractions. What he called the 'warming effect' of direct currents irritated the skin, since, at voltage strengths needed for muscle contractions, they cause the skin to blister (at the anode) and pit (at the cathode). Furthermore, with DC each contraction required the current to be stopped and restarted. Moreover, alternating current could produce strong muscle contractions regardless of the condition of the muscle, whereas DC-induced contractions were strong if the muscle was strong, and weak if the muscle was weak.

Since that time almost all rehabilitation involving muscle contraction has been done with a symmetrical rectangular biphasic waveform. During the 1940s, however, the U.S. War Department, investigating the application of electrical stimulation not just to retard and prevent atrophy but to restore muscle mass and strength, employed what was termed galvanic exercise on the atrophied hands of patients who had an ulnar nerve lesion from surgery upon a wound. These galvanic exercises employed a monophasic (single-pulse) direct current waveform.

The American Physical Therapy Association, a professional organization representing physical therapists, accepts the use of electrotherapy in the field of physical therapy.

See also  
 Alfred Charles Garratt
 Cranial electrotherapy stimulation
 Electrical brain stimulation
 Electroanalgesia
 Electroconvulsive therapy
 Electrotherapy (cosmetic)
 Galvanic bath
 Microcurrent electrical neuromuscular stimulator
 Neuromuscular diagnostics
 Pulsed electromagnetic field therapy

 Transcranial direct-current stimulation
 Transcranial magnetic stimulation
 Transcutaneous electrical nerve stimulation
 Vagus nerve stimulation

References

External links

 Atlas of Electrotherapy (PDF)
 Tim Watson's site

 
Medical treatments
Analgesics